The Jatiluhur Dam is a multi-purpose embankment dam on the Citarum River in West Java, Indonesia.

Jatiluhur Dam was designed by Coyne et Bellier and was constructed between 1957 and 1965 while the power station become operational in 1967. The dam serves several purposes including the provision of hydroelectric power generation, water supply, flood control, irrigation and aquaculture. The power station has an installed capacity of 186.5 MW which feeds into the Java grid managed by the state-owned electricity company Perusahaan Listrik Negara. The Jatiluhur reservoir helps irrigate  of rice fields.

See also

List of power stations in Indonesia

References

Purwakarta Regency
Dams in Indonesia
Hydroelectric power stations in Indonesia
Earth-filled dams
Dams completed in 1965
Lakes of Java
Energy infrastructure completed in 1967
1967 establishments in Indonesia
Landforms of West Java
Reservoirs in Indonesia